A Warrior's Journey is a fantasy novel by Paul B. Thompson and Tonya C. Cook, set in the world of Dragonlance, and based on the Dungeons & Dragons role-playing game. It is the first novel in the "Ergoth" trilogy. It was published in paperback in May 2003.

Plot summary
A Warrior's Journey is a novel in which a young peasant boy deals with the chaos caused by the struggle between two rival empires.

Reception
Critic Don D'Ammassa wrote that despite there being "nothing out of the ordinary", A Warrior's Journey is "a good story and won't disappoint most readers."

References

2003 novels
Dragonlance novels